East Beckham is a village and a civil parish in the English county of Norfolk. The nearest railway station is in the town of Sheringham, where access to the national rail network can be made via the Bittern Line to Norwich. The nearest Airport is Norwich International Airport. East Beckham is within the area covered by North Norfolk District Council. At the 2011 Census the population was less than 100 and is included with civil parish of West Beckham.

The villages name means 'Becca's homestead/village' or perhaps, 'Becca's hemmed-in land'. 'East' to distinguish from West Beckham.

Gresham Family
James Gresham (1442–1497), Lord of the Manor of East Beckham, was the grandfather of the Sir John Gresham who founded Gresham's School in 1555 and the great-grandfather of the Sir Thomas Gresham who established Gresham College and the Royal Exchange in the City of London.

References

http://kepn.nottingham.ac.uk/map/place/Norfolk/East%20Beckham

External links

Villages in Norfolk
North Norfolk
Civil parishes in Norfolk